Baxter Arena (previously known under the working name UNO Community Arena) is the sports arena owned and operated by the University of Nebraska Omaha located in Omaha, Nebraska. Completed in 2015, Baxter Arena serves as the home of several of the university's sports teams, known as the Omaha Mavericks. The arena opened to the public on October 23, 2015 when the Mavericks men's ice hockey team hosted Air Force, winning 4–2.

Background
In 2012, Omaha mayor Jim Suttle announced that the Omaha Civic Auditorium would close in 2014 due to excessive maintenance costs. The closing of the Auditorium would leave Omaha without a mid-sized indoor venue, and would also have a major impact on the Mavericks ice hockey team. While the team played its home games at the city's main indoor venue, then known as CenturyLink Center Omaha, it regularly practiced at the Auditorium. It was already one of the few NCAA Division I hockey teams without a dedicated practice facility. Additionally, the 14,000-seat CenturyLink Center was increasingly being seen as too large for the hockey program's needs.

The university then began planning for a new arena, selecting a site at the Aksarben Village development, which has become integrated with the UNO campus in recent years. The arena received approval from the University of Nebraska Board of Regents on March 15, 2013. It was originally budgeted at $75 million, but the final cost came in at $81.6 million. Nearly half of the cost was expected to be covered by donations, and UNO announced in June 2015 that it had sold the naming rights to Baxter Auto, a group of auto dealerships in Omaha and the surrounding region, for $400,000 per year over 10 years.

The arena was expected to more than cover its required debt service. UNO's financial projections assumed that the arena would host only four non-university events per year. However, the venue is available to lease for events that would have been hosted by the Auditorium before its closure. At least three area school districts, including the Omaha city district, moved their high school graduations to the arena by 2016.

The new arena has been the full-time home to the Omaha men's and women's basketball teams and a secondary home for the women's volleyball team from its opening. The volleyball team played its first game in the arena near the end of the 2015 season on November 1, and also played its final home game of the season there on November 10. Ever since, both basketball teams have played all home games at the arena. In 2016, the arena hosted President Obama, the first sitting President to visit the University of Nebraska Omaha.

Features

The arena currently has a fixed seat capacity of 7,898. It has 17 luxury suites, 750 club seats, and a 750-seat student section.  It also has two separate ice sheets—one in the main arena for games, and a second that serves as a dedicated practice facility for the Mavericks. Unlike most venues of this type, the practice rink is the most visible to those entering through the main gate—according to Mavericks athletic director Trev Alberts, "This will probably be the first and only arena you’ll see where the focal point of the entire arena is the community ice." UNO has committed to provide at least a third of the venue's ice time for community purposes.

Events 
In 2017 the arena held two major curling events. The first, in August, was the U.S. Grand Prix of Curling, a made-for-television competition that is broadcast as Curling Night in America. Then in November the United States Curling Association held the 2017 United States Olympic Curling Trials at the arena.

See also
 University of Nebraska Omaha
 List of NCAA Division I basketball arenas

References

External links
University of Nebraska Omaha: Baxter Arena

Indoor arenas in Nebraska
University of Nebraska Omaha
Omaha Mavericks
Sports venues completed in 2015
Sports venues in Omaha, Nebraska
Omaha Mavericks men's ice hockey
Basketball venues in Nebraska